Fiona Maazel (born 1975 in Cleveland, Ohio) is the author of three novels: Last Last Chance, Woke Up Lonely, and A Little More Human. In 2008 she was named a 5 under 35 honoree by the National Book Foundation. In 2017, she was awarded a Guggenheim Fellowship.

Early life
Her father was conductor Lorin Maazel.  Her mother is Israela Margalit, a pianist and scriptwriter.

Career
Maazel's fiction and non-fiction have appeared in many publications, including Harper's, The New York Times Book Review, The New York Times, Tin House, Bomb, Fence, The Mississippi Review, Conjunctions, The Common, The Yale Review, Anthem, The Village Voice, N+1, This American Life, Selected Shorts, and on Salon.com.

Woke Up Lonely is about a cult leader, his ex-wife, and the four government employees he takes hostage. Last Last Chance tells the story of Lucy Clark, a drug addict with a complicated family and a difficult life. Joshua Henkin of The New York Times said of the book: "'Last Last Chance' isn’t your average novel, thanks in no small part to Maazel's funny, lacerating prose."

She is a 2008 National Book Foundation "5 Under 35" honoree, winner of the Bard Fiction Prize for 2009, and in 2005 she was awarded a Lannan Literary Fellowship. She has been the Picador Guest Professor for Literature at the University of Leipzig, and has taught at Columbia, Princeton, NYU, and Syracuse University.

She is also the Director of Communications for Measures for Justice.

Personal life
Maazel lives in Brooklyn.

Works 
Last Last Chance New York : Picador/ Farrar, Straus and Giroux, 2008, 
Woke Up Lonely Minneapolis, Minnesota : Graywolf Press, 2014. , 
A Little More Human  Minneapolis, Minnesota: Graywolf Press, 2017,

References

External links
Official website
Fiona Maazel at Macmillan
http://www.bard.edu/news/releases/pr/fstory.php?id=1542
http://www.lannan.org/lf/bios/detail/fiona-maazel/ 
2013 Bomb Magazine interview of Fiona Maazel by Justin Taylor

1975 births
Living people
American people of Russian-Jewish descent
Jewish American novelists
American women novelists
Writers from Cleveland
21st-century American novelists
Academic staff of Leipzig University
New York University faculty
Williams College alumni
Brooklyn College faculty
Princeton University faculty
Columbia University faculty
21st-century American women writers
Novelists from New Jersey
Novelists from Ohio
Novelists from New York (state)
American women academics
21st-century American Jews